{{DISPLAYTITLE:C6H5N3O4}}
The molecular formula C6H5N3O4 may refer to:

 Dinitroanilines
 2,3-Dinitroaniline
 2,4-Dinitroaniline
 2,5-Dinitroaniline
 2,6-Dinitroaniline
 3,4-Dinitroaniline
 3,5-Dinitroaniline